Edmund Neville was an English conspirator.

Edmund Neville may also refer to:

Edmund Neville Nevill
Edmund de Neville, MP for Lancashire (UK Parliament constituency)